Fritz Wiedemann (16 August 1891 in Augsburg – 17 January 1970 in Postmünster) was a German soldier and Nazi Party activist. He was for a time the personal adjutant to Adolf Hitler, having served with him in World War I. The two men subsequently had a falling-out, and Wiedemann secretly repudiated his Nazi beliefs, warning American and British figures about Hitler's plans for Europe. On one occasion he actively intervened to help the Jewish-born widow of Willi Schmid, a wrongful victim of the Night of the Long Knives, escape Germany.

War service 
Wiedemann and Hitler first came into contact during the First World War when Hauptmann Wiedemann, as regimental adjutant, was Corporal Hitler's superior. Along with Max Amann he was one of Hitler's strongest supporters in the regiment, nominating him for the Iron Cross, First Class on a number of occasions before the medal was given in 1918. Whilst giving evidence at the Nuremberg Trials, Wiedemann suggested that Hitler had failed to gain promotion in the regiment due to commanding officers viewing him as a 'Bohemian'.

Hitler's adjutant 
After the war Wiedemann left the army and became a farmer, initially refusing an offer from Hitler at the regimental reunion in 1922 to help organise the Sturmabteilung (SA). However, when Hitler came to power in 1933 Wiedemann accepted a new offer, initially in the offices of Rudolf Hess before taking up his post at Hitler's side, as well as Nazi Party membership, on 2 February 1934. From then on Wiedemann remained at Hitler's side, accompanying him on state visits, facilitating meetings and dealing with Hitler's correspondence. He also attended a meeting with Lord Halifax in July 1938 in which Wiedemann gave reassurances that "no forcible action" was anticipated by Hitler over the Sudetenland unless there were some serious incident to provoke it.

Diplomatic service 
Not long after this Wiedemann fell out of favour with Hitler as his rival Julius Schaub became the more important adjutant. After trysting with Stephanie von Hohenlohe, he was "exiled", in January 1939, to San Francisco as a Consul General to the United States. In public, Wiedemann continued to support Nazism and apparently led a playboy lifestyle which included attendance at society parties, membership of the exclusive Olympic Club and regular appearances in the columns of Herb Caen.

Allegations leveled in a case filed at the city's Federal District Court in 1941 also suggested that he worked on pro-Nazi initiatives with Henry Ford. In private, however, Wiedemann broke entirely with Nazism. He met with the British agent Sir William Wiseman, warning him of Hitler's unstable personality and urging Britain to attack Germany. He also offered to publicly denounce the German regime, but the White House at that time had no interest in such an offer.

Thomas Weber has found the records of Wiedemann's talks with him in 1940 in which Wiedemann openly warned against Hitler and claimed Hitler had a "split personality and numbered among the most cruel people in the world, saw himself better than Napoleon and that peace with him was impossible." He told Wiseman of Hitler's plans to attack and conquer the UK and "recommended strongly" that the British themselves strike as quickly and as "hard as possible" against him.

He told Wiseman that the morale of the German population and the support of Hitler were lower than generally believed. Thomas Weber said if Hitler had known about Wiedemann's "treason," he would have given him the death penalty.

China 
Wiedemann was subsequently sent to Tientsin where he was a central figure in German espionage in China, apparently this time without betraying Hitler.

Post-war 
After the Second World War, Wiedemann was arrested in Tientsin, China, in September 1945, and flown to the United States. He gave evidence at Nuremberg although charges made against him were dropped in 1948 and he subsequently returned to farming, disappearing from public life.

Some 7,000 personal and semiofficial papers of Fritz Wiedemann, one-time company commander in the infantry regiment in which Adolf Hitler served as corporal and later personal adjutant to Hitler, have been acquired by the Library.Library of Congress, 1949

In 2012 it was claimed that Wiedemann helped to save Hitler's Jewish commanding officer, Ernst Hess. Hess's daughter Ursula, by then 86 and still living in Germany, stated in an interview with the Jewish Voice that her father had, by chance, met Wiedemann, with whom he served in the first world war, and that when he later became Hitler's adjutant he had been able to secure concessions for Hess that were not otherwise open to Jews.

References

External links 
Fritz Wiedemann
Fritz Wiedemann – Munzinger Biographie
 

1891 births
1970 deaths
Adolf Hitler
Ambassadors of Germany to the United States
German farmers
German Army personnel of World War I
Officials of Nazi Germany
Military personnel from Augsburg
National Socialist Motor Corps members
Members of the Reichstag of Nazi Germany
Military personnel of Bavaria
Adjutants of Adolf Hitler